The 1996 South Africa rugby union tour of Argentina and Europe was a series of rugby union matches played during November and December 1996 in Argentina, France and Wales by the South Africa national rugby union team.

At the same time, the second level team, ("South Africa A") was involved in a tour of Great Britain and Ireland.

The Springboks Tour

Touring party

Manager–Coach: Andre Markgraaff
Assistant coach: Hugh Reece-Edwards
Assistant coach: Nick Mallett
Assistant coach: Carel du Plessis (backline adviser)

 Legend: sub = Player that join the tour later as a replacement

Results 
Scores and results list South Africa's points tally first.

Test Matches

First Test: Argentina

Second Test: Argentina

First Test: France

Second Test: France

Test: Wales

The South Africa "A" Tour

Touring party
Manager: Arthob Petersen
Coach: Manie Spamer
Assistant coaches: Eric Sauls and Gert Smal

 Legend: sub = Player that join the tour later as a replacement

Results 
Scores and results list South Africa's points tally first.

See also
 History of rugby union matches between Argentina and South Africa
 History of rugby union matches between France and South Africa
 History of rugby union matches between South Africa and Wales

References

1996 rugby union tours
1996 in South African rugby union
1996 in Argentine rugby union
1996–97 in English rugby union
1996–97 in French rugby union
1996–97 in Welsh rugby union
1996–97 in Irish rugby union
1996–97 in European rugby union
1996
1996
1996
1996
1996
1996
1996
1996